Princess Leia's bikini (also known as Princess Leia's metal bikini) is an iconic costume worn by actress Carrie Fisher as Princess Leia in the 1983 Star Wars film Return of the Jedi.

Development
Costume designer Aggie Guerard Rodgers built the costume as part of the Industrial Light & Magic visual effects company, along with Nilo Rodis-Jamero. Rodgers said that Lucas gave her only general instructions about the scene in Jabba's palace, but wanted a special costume. She originally "wanted 25 yards of fabric to be flowing through the scene", but could not make it work.

The outfit was first developed in sketches by Rodis-Jamero, assistant art director of visual effects for The Empire Strikes Back and the Return of the Jedi costume designer. Rodgers said in 2006 that the costume's design was inspired by the work of science fiction artist Frank Frazetta, saying "He really loved [the female] form. The fact that [Leia's costume is] such a female sensual costume, I think is terrific." Author Rikke Schubart wrote in 2007 that the final design was inspired by Fantastic Story Magazine cover illustrator Earle K. Bergey drawings of women in metal bikinis that served as putative armors. The costume is a type that can be traced to earlier films, such as Myrna Loy’s turn as the native dancing girl in The Desert Song from 1929, Yvonne De Carlo in Slave Girl, 1947, and Maria Montez adventure films from the 1940s. The bikini was also worn by stuntwoman Tracy Eddon for the film. In the 1997 PlayStation game Star Wars: Masters of Teräs Käsi, Leia wears the outfit as "Slave Leia", an unlockable playable character.

Design and material

Rodgers and the staff created multiple versions of the metal bikini string to accommodate different scenes in the film, including a hard metal piece (original bronze bra by Sculptor Richard Miller who is credited as "head jeweler" in the film credits) for scenes in which Fisher remained still, and a rubber outfit she and stuntwoman Tracy Eddon could wear comfortably while performing stunts. The costume designers made a mold of Carrie Fisher's torso so it could be designed to a custom fit. Fisher said of the material, "It was like steel, not steel, but hard plastic, and if you stood behind me you could see straight to Florida. You'll have to ask Boba Fett about that." She also said the bikini is "what supermodels will eventually wear in the seventh ring of hell."

 Top: The outfit consisted of a patterned copper brassiere with a curved, plunging neckline that fastened behind the neck and back with string.
 Bottom: The outfit had a copper plate at the front and both the front and the back were covered by a red silk loincloth.
 Accessories: Fisher wore knee-high boots of leather, a hair fastener that positioned her braided ponytail to cascade over her right shoulder, two bracelets, and a snake arm-wrap. She also wore a chain and collar that bound her to Jabba the Hutt, her captor, which she used to kill him.

Reception

Featured only in two scenes, the "Slave Leia" costume has nonetheless made Carrie Fisher an iconic sex symbol. The outfit has been elevated to pop culture icon status, spawning various spoofs and parodies and even a dedicated fansite. Wired wrote that the only reason for the costume's fame is "no doubt that the sight of Carrie Fisher in the gold sci-fi swimsuit was burned into the sweaty subconscious of a generation of fanboys hitting puberty in the spring of 1983." Noah Berlatsky argued in The Guardian for a deeper significance to the costume beyond its function as a sex symbol, stating that the outfit represents an important stage in Princess Leia's complicated relationship with Han Solo. Peter W. Lee argues that the bikini connotes Leia's hopelessness and helplessness, but even in that demeaning costume she retains her dignity and remains an icon of feminism.

The costume is a popular cosplay at Star Wars Celebrations and comic conventions, and has become a popular Halloween costume. Various celebrities have also been shown wearing the costume. Melissa Joan Hart, the star of the shows Clarissa Explains It All and Sabrina, the Teenage Witch, was photographed wearing the outfit during a costume party. Kerri Kasem, a radio and television host, has been photographed wearing the costume. Actress/model Phoebe Price wore it at the San Diego Comic-Con International in 2010. Liana K, the Canadian co-host of Ed & Red's Night Party and a well-known cosplayer, appeared at 2008 Calgary Comic and Entertainment Expo dressed in Princess Leia's slave girl outfit. Comedian Amy Schumer wore a replica of Leia's slave outfit for the August 2015 cover of GQ.

With Disney's 2012 acquisition of Lucasfilm, merchandise featuring the costume ceased to be made, apparently in response to a Fox News segment in which parents described difficulties explaining toys featuring the costume (including a chain around Leia's neck) to their children. Fisher called Disney's decision "stupid," saying, "Tell [the kids] that a giant slug captured me and forced me to wear that stupid outfit, and then I killed him because I didn't like it."

In 2015, Fisher said "I am not a sex symbol, so that's an opinion of someone. I don’t share that", and told Daisy Ridley to "fight for your outfit. Don't be a slave like I was".

In popular culture

References

External links

 
 

1983 clothing
Fictional elements introduced in 1983
Individual bikinis
Fictional garments
Return of the Jedi